Isnard can refer to:

 Achille-Nicolas Isnard (1748-1803), French economist
 Maximin Isnard (1755-1825), French revolutionary politician
 Jean-Esprit Isnard (1707–1781), French organ builder
 Jean-Baptiste Isnard (1726-1800), French organ builder (nephew of Jean-Esprit)
 Joseph Isnard (1740-1828), French organ builder (nephew of Jean-Esprit)
 Antoine-Tristan Danty d'Isnard (1663–1743), French botanist
 Clemente Isnard (1917–2011), Brazilian bishop